Ajdin Mujagić (born 3 January 1998) is a Bosnian professional footballer who plays as a forward for First League of FBiH club TOŠK Tešanj.

Club career
Mujagić made his Premier League of Bosnia and Herzegovina debut for FK Željezničar Sarajevo on 25 October 2015 in a game against NK Čelik Zenica and scored on his debut. In 2018 he was loaned out to NK Travnik where he showed his talent scoring 4 goals in 8 league games that season. 

After his loan at Travnik ended, he left Željezničar and in July 2018 signed with FK Mladost Doboj Kakanj. At Mladost he didn't get much playing time as he played only 6 league games. In December 2018, only 5 months after joining Mladost, he left the club.

On 9 January 2019, Mujagić signed with NK TOŠK Tešanj. In the summer of 2019, he left TOŠK and signed for Swiss club NK Pajde Möhlin.

References

External links

1998 births
People from Tešanj
Living people
Bosnia and Herzegovina footballers
Bosnia and Herzegovina youth international footballers
FK Željezničar Sarajevo players
NK Travnik players
FK Mladost Doboj Kakanj players
NK TOŠK Tešanj players
FK Igman Konjic players
Premier League of Bosnia and Herzegovina players
First League of the Federation of Bosnia and Herzegovina players
Association football forwards